Marie Michelle Currie (born November 30, 1959) is an American singer, songwriter, actress, and artist. Currie is best known for playing in a band with her identical twin Cherie Currie called Cherie & Marie Currie. Their song "Since You Been Gone" charted at number 95 on the US charts. Marie played Singing Maid Marie in The Rosebud Beach Hotel and is now a popular multi-media sculptor and artist.

Early life
Currie was born to Don Currie and actress Marie Harmon. She was raised in Encino with three siblings. Her brother is Don Currie Jr. She has an elder sister, actress Sondra Currie, and an identical twin sister, Cherie Currie. Marie was the first twin born and Cherie was the second.

Currie and her twin sister were given a role on an episode of My Three Sons at the age of two. They were going to sing "Twinkle, Twinkle, Little Star" with Fred MacMurray but they froze during filming and their part was cut from the show. Before Currie and her twin sister rose to fame, they also danced on American Bandstand. They appeared on the show as background dancers.

Career
While her sister Cherie was in the Runaways, Currie worked at a fast food restaurant. Then she started the Marie Currie Band. They never released a record, or received a record deal.  However, they managed to receive some press; including a few pictures of the band landed in magazine articles across the U.S. and Japan. She started her career as a singer by singing a duet with Cherie called "Love at First Sight". The song appeared on Cherie's debut album Beauty's Only Skin Deep.

In 1979, Cherie and Marie released two singles "Messin' with the Boys" and "Since You Been Gone". "Since You Been Gone" charted number 95 on U.S. charts. In 1980, Cherie and Marie released their album, Messin' with the Boys the album received more radio play than Beauty's Only Skin Deep. They released another single that year "This Time".

Cherie and Marie performed on television shows in the 1980s including Sha Na Na, The Mike Douglas Show, The Merv Griffin Show, among others. In 1984, they played the singing maids in The Rosebud Beach Hotel. The twins sang, wrote, and produced songs for the film and its soundtrack. That film was Marie's acting debut.  In 1991, they performed at the Coconut Teaser which was a tribute concert to Paula Pierce, a member of The Pandoras. For the final performance the remaining Pandoras backed the Curries.

Currie performed with her sister's band at the Runaways reunion which included Jackie Fox and Sandy West. In 1997, she worked as a mortgage banker, along with her brother, Don. She later became a sales and branch development manager for HighTechLending Inc, founded by her brother.

In 1997, Cherie and Marie re-released Messin' with the Boys with seven bonus tracks. In 1998, they held a concert at the Golden Apple, in support of their re-released version of Messin' with the Boys. Cherie's ex-bandmate West joined Cherie on stage to perform some of the Runaways songs. In 1998, Cherie and Marie released a compilation called Young and Wild. In 1999 Rocket City Records released Cherie's album The 80's Collection. The album features guest work done by Marie.

Currie was portrayed by Riley Keough in the film The Runaways, about her sister Cherie Currie's first band the Runaways.

Later years
On January 30, 2014, her novel The Narrow Road of Light was published.

Personal life
Currie married Steve Lukather, lead guitarist and co-vocalist of Toto in February 1981. They met in the studio during the recording of Messin' with the Boys. They had two children together before divorcing. Currie and Luthaker appeared on the cover of Steel Notes Magazine (alongside singer Debbie Harry, and model Josi Kat) with a lengthy feature story on her life and work featured in the issue.

References in pop culture
Currie's then husband, Steve Lukather, wrote and dedicated Toto's songs, "I'll Be Over You" and "I Won't Hold You Back" to her.

Harmony Korine has stated that the characters Dot and Helen Darby (played by Chloë Sevigny and Carisa Glucksman) in his 1997 film Gummo "were  a combination of Cherie and Marie Currie, home schooling, and The Shaggs."

In 2018 a photo of Marie Currie appeared in Bad Reputation a documentary about Cherie's ex-bandmate, Joan Jett's career. Kim Fowley tells the story of how he would not allow them both to join the Runaways because he did not want a set of identical twins being backed by an all-girl rock band. Therefore, only Cherie joined.

Discography

Studio albums
 1980 – Messin' with the Boys
 1997 – Messin' with the Boys (re-release)
 1998 – Young and Wild (compilation)
 1999 – The 80's Collection

Guest appearances
 1978 – Cherie Currie – Beauty's Only Skin Deep
 1984  – various artist –  The Rosebud Beach Hotel Soundtrack

Singles

Album charts

Filmography

Bibliography

References

Actresses from Los Angeles
American film actresses
American identical twins
Identical twin females
Twin musicians
American television actresses
Women punk rock singers
American women heavy metal singers
American artists
1959 births
Living people
People from Encino, Los Angeles
Women rock singers
American women rock singers
21st-century American women singers
21st-century American singers